The name Seniang has been used for twelve tropical cyclones in the Philippines by PAGASA in the Western Pacific. Seniang is a nickname for a woman.

 Typhoon Ida (1964) (T6412, 15W, Seniang) – struck the Philippines and China, killing 75 people.
 Typhoon Nina (1968) (T6826, 31W, Seniang)
 Tropical Depression Seniang (1972)
 Typhoon Hope (1976) (T7619, 19W, Seniang)
 Tropical Depression Seniang (1980)
 Tropical Depression Seniang (1984)
 Typhoon Odessa (1988) (T8826, 21W, Seniang)
 Typhoon Gay (1992) (T9231, 31W, Seniang) – long-lived Category 5 super typhoon that affected the Marshall Islands and struck Guam.
 Tropical Storm Beth (1996) (T9622, 32W, Seniang) – struck Luzon and then made landfall in Vietnam.
 Tropical Storm Bebinca (2000) (T0021, 31W, Seniang) – struck the Philippines.
 Typhoon Utor (2006) (T0622, 25W, Seniang) – struck the Philippines.
 Tropical Storm Jangmi (2014) (T1423, 23W, Seniang) – struck the Philippines, causing the deaths of 66 people and ₱1.27 billion in damages.

Seniang was retired from use in the Philippine area of responsibility following the 2014 typhoon season and replaced with Samuel.

Pacific typhoon set index articles